Petar Kushev (Bulgarian: Петър Кушев; born 21 January 1971) is a retired Bulgarian footballer.

Biography

In his career, Kushev represented FC Kremikovtzi, Septemvri Sofia, Litex Lovech, Dobrudzha Dobrich, Wattenscheid, Uerdingen, Rot-Weiß Erfurt, Paderborn, and FC Lipstadt. Kushev is also a player's agent. 

He was involved in a kidnapping of his own son in December 2006.

References

1971 births
Living people
Association football defenders
Bulgarian footballers
First Professional Football League (Bulgaria) players
PFC Litex Lovech players
PFC Dobrudzha Dobrich players
Expatriate footballers in Germany
Bulgarian expatriate footballers
Bulgarian expatriate sportspeople in Germany
KFC Uerdingen 05 players
SG Wattenscheid 09 players